Nélida Sifuentes Cueto (born 1981) is a Bolivian politician and a union leader of the indigenous peasant movement. She was elected in 2009 to the Bolivian Senate, and in 2013 she served as first vice-president of the Senate.

Biography 
Nélida Sifuentes was born in Chuquisaca on 18 July 1981. At the age of 15 she was an ACLO radio reporter in Chuquisaca, becoming chair of a departmental association of reporters, and was later a community leader in the canton of :de:Tarabuquillo.  She held executive positions in Tomina province (2003) and in the prefecture of Chuquisaca (2006), and from 2004 to 2006 was general secretary of the indigenous organization Federación Única de Pueblos Originarios de Chuquisaca (F.U.T.P.O.CH.). 

In 2009 she was elected Senator for the Movimiento al Socialismo (MAS - IPSP) party, representing the department of Chuquisaca in the Plurinational Legislative Assembly of Bolivia. She was chair (2014–15) and secretary (2017–18) of the Senate committee on land, natural resources and environment, and has been instrumental in implementing a cybersecurity strategy for the Bolivian state.

References

External links
 Blog

People from Chuquisaca Department
1981 births
Members of the Senate of Bolivia
Living people
Women members of the Senate of Bolivia
21st-century Bolivian women politicians
Movement for Socialism (Bolivia) politicians
21st-century Bolivian politicians
Bolivian senators from Chuquisaca
Bolivian trade union leaders